The Résoatao Party is a political party in Benin.

History
The party was formed by Mohamed Atao Hinnouho in February 2013. It received 2% of the vote in the 2015 parliamentary elections, winning a single seat, taken by Hinnouho.

Following a party primary, Hinnouho was selected as the party's candidate for the 2016 presidential elections.

References

2013 establishments in Benin
Political parties established in 2013
Political parties in Benin